Oboronia is an Afrotropical genus of butterfly in the family Lycaenidae.

Species
Oboronia albicosta (Gaede, 1916)
Oboronia bueronica Karsch, 1895
Oboronia guessfeldti (Dewitz, 1879)
Oboronia liberiana Stempffer, 1950
Oboronia ornata (Mabille, 1890)
Oboronia pseudopunctatus (Strand, 1912)
Oboronia punctatus (Dewitz, 1879)

References

* Seitz, A. Die Gross-Schmetterlinge der Erde 13: Die Afrikanischen Tagfalter. Plate XIII 74

Polyommatini
Lycaenidae genera
Taxa named by Ferdinand Karsch